Serhiy Yefremov (October 18, 1876 – March 31, 1939) was a Ukrainian literary journalist, historian, critic, political activist, statesman, and academician. He was a member of the Ukrainian Academy of Science (1919) and Shevchenko Scientific Society in Lviv. Yefremov is his literary pseudonym; his real name is Okhrimenko.

Early years
Serhiy Okhrimenko was born in the village of Palchik, Zvenigorodka uyezd of the Kyiv Governorate. Today the village still stands, but in Cherkasy Raion of the Cherkasy Oblast, in central Ukraine. He was born in an Eastern Orthodox family. He studied from 1891-1896 at the Kyivan Theological Seminary. Later he graduated from the Faculty of Law at Kyiv University.

Political start
Political activity started during student years becoming the member of the Ukrainian Universal non-Party Democratic Organization. In 1904 became co-founder of the Ukrainian Radical Party, which in 1905 out of his initiative united together with the Ukrainian Democratic Party and establishing the Ukrainian Democratic Radical Party. In 1905 became the leader of the Ukrainian Social Union (USU) Peasant Union. In 1908 became the co-founder of the Society of Ukrainian Progressionists. He worked in the variety of Ukrainian periodicals such as Zoria, Pravda, Kyivan Past, Ukraina etc. In 1885–1918 he was the head of publishing Vik.

Secretariat
He was arrested numerous times by the Russian authorities for pressing public speeches in defense of national culture and political freedoms in pre-revolutionary period. In March 1917 Okhrimenko entered the staff of the Central Rada. In April 1917, at the Ukrainian National Congress was elected as the deputy of the Head of the Rada and the member of the Mala Rada. On June 15, 1917 became the general secretary of the International Affairs in the newly formed Ukrainian government, General Secretary of the Ukrainian People's Republic. On July 17, 1917 he was replaced by Oleksandr Shulhyn from the same political party. From September 1917 heads the Ukrainian Party of Socialists-Federalists. From April 1918 and until 1920 he did not hold any official positions.

Soviet Ukraine

With the installation of Soviet power in Ukraine was forced to go into the illegal situation and hiding. In spring 1919, at the request of the Ukrainian Academy of Science, he was amnestied. From 1922 until 1928, he was one of the leaders of the Ukrainian Academy of Science. He was the chief defendant in the 1929 public show trial of the leaders of the supposed Union for the Liberation of Ukraine. In 1930, he was sentenced to death, but the sentence was later commuted to ten years in prison. He died in 1939 while in Vladimir Central Prison.

References

Further reading
Mykhailo Hrushevsky, edited by O. J. Frederiksen. A History of Ukraine. New Haven: Yale University Press: 1941.
Ihor Pidkova (editor), Roman Shust (editor), "Dovidnyk z istorii Ukrainy", 3 Volumes, Kiev, 1993–1999,  (t. 1),  (t. 2),  (t. 3). Article: Єфремов Сергій Олександрович

External links
Serhii Yefremov at the Encyclopedia of Ukraine

1876 births
1939 deaths
People from Cherkasy Oblast
People from Zvenigorodsky Uyezd (Kiev Governorate)
Ukrainian Democratic Party (1904) politicians
20th-century Ukrainian politicians
Foreign ministers of Ukraine
Members of the Central Council of Ukraine
Ukrainian diplomats
Society of Ukrainian Progressors members
20th-century Ukrainian historians
Ukrainian literary critics
Ukrainian independence activists
Members of the Shevchenko Scientific Society
Union for the Freedom of Ukraine trial
Inmates of Vladimir Central Prison
Ukrainian prisoners and detainees
Ukrainian prisoners sentenced to death
Prisoners sentenced to death by the Soviet Union
Ukrainian people who died in Soviet detention
Enforced disappearances in the Soviet Union
Nonpersons in the Eastern Bloc